Thiranthidu Seese is a 2015 Indian Tamil-language thriller film directed by Nimesh Varshan. The film stars Veeravan Stalin, Dhansika, Narayan and Anjena Kirti. Music for the film was composed by Ganesh Raghavendra and the film opened to positive reviews in May 2015.

Cast
 Dhansika as Charmi
 Narayan as Hussain
 Veeravan Stalin as John
 Anjena Kirti as Dhivya
 Ujayinee
 E. Ramdoss
 Eshwar Babu
 Gudalur Chandraprakash

Production
Producer Veeravan Stalin chose to appear in the lead role himself, while Dhansika and Narayan were also signed on for the film. Anjena Kirti plays the pair of the Lead Veeravan Stalin . The debutant director Varshan, an erstwhile assistant of director Shankar, revealed that the film would revolve around the events of a single night and would carry a social message. Prior to release, Dhansika released a press statement describing her pride at being a part of the venture.

Release
The film opened in May 2015 to positive reviews, with a critic from the Times of India noting "there is spark in the director that makes us want to laud him, more so because this is a first-time effort", though adds that the "film suddenly seems over-long and the climactic twist is staged awkwardly that we are underwhelmed". Likewise, the critic from The New Indian Express noted "what the director has managed to do is to keep the narration suspense-filled and intriguing for the most part" and praises the film's lead performances. The performances of Dhansika and Narayan in the film, fetched the actors further offers.

References

External links 
 

2015 films
2010s Tamil-language films
Indian feminist films
Films about women in India
Indian films about revenge
Indian thriller films
2015 directorial debut films
2010s feminist films
2015 thriller films